Polyboroides is a genus of bird of prey in the family Accipitridae. This genus has two recognized species found in Sub-Saharan Africa and Madagascar. The two species are allopatric and restricted to the Afrotropical realm. They are generally known as harrier-hawks.

Etymology 
Polyboroides: Genus Polyborus Vieillot, 1816;  -oidēs "resembling".

Species 
The genus Polyboroides has two recognized species:

See also 
 Harrier (bird)

References 

 
Bird genera
 
Taxonomy articles created by Polbot